"Best of My Love" is a song by English singer and songwriter Javine. The single was released on 14 June 2004 and was the third single from her album Surrender (2004). The single reached the #18 in the UK Singles Chart, her third consecutive top 20 song.

Production
Following her recent success with her previous singles (Real Things and Surrender (Your Love)) which both charted in the Top 20 in the UK (the latter in the Top 5), Javine followed the path in which she had taken with Surrender (Your Love) being pop oriented R&B. The song is an Indian-stylised modern R&B song, with the opening beat containing pieces from a sitar.

The song has been called a "modern day fusion", containing old-fashioned Indian music and modern R&B music, as well as the British-Indian music fusion.

The song was recorded in 2003 for her debut (and only) album Surrender, and was released the following year as the third single from the album. The song maintained Javine's success on the charts, peaking inside the Top 20 at Number 18, as well charting in Ireland (which Javine's previous singles had also managed to do).

The song, which is a standout track due to its 'fusion-esque' style, could have been the inspiration or foundation for Javine's Eurovision entry in 2005 (Touch My Fire), which also has an eastern style (although more heavy) and this time, incorporated into dance.

Formats and track listings
CD: 1

 Best of My Love
 Real Things (Urban North Remix)
 
CD: 2
 Best of My Love
 Best of My Love (Johnny Douglas 7" Club Mix)
 Best of My Love (Urban North Master Mix)
 Surrender (Your Love) (Original Version)

Charts

References

2004 singles
Javine songs
2004 songs
Songs written by Lindy Robbins
Virgin Records singles
Songs written by Simon Ellis (record producer)